Ilya Sergeyevich Karpuk (born 7 August 1997) is a Russian football player. He plays for FC Tekstilshchik Ivanovo.

Club career
He made his debut in the Russian Football National League for FC Yenisey Krasnoyarsk on 27 February 2021 in a game against FC Volgar Astrakhan.

References

External links
 
 Profile by Russian Football National League

1997 births
Sportspeople from Krasnoyarsk
Living people
Russian footballers
Association football forwards
FC Yenisey Krasnoyarsk players
Russian First League players
FC Zvezda Perm players
FC Volga Ulyanovsk players
FC Tekstilshchik Ivanovo players
20th-century Russian people
21st-century Russian people